HYT is a watchmaking company based in Neuchâtel, Switzerland. It is the only watchmaking company to display time with fluids.

HYT was launched in 2012 when it introduced its first hybrid timepiece, the H1, during BaselWorld. They won 3 awards the same year:
 Best Innovative Watch 2012 – Grand Prix d'Horlogerie de Genève;
 Best concept watch of the year – SIAR in Mexico;
 Best concept watch of the year – Watch World Award in India.

HYT filed for bankruptcy in March 2021. Kairos Technology Switzerland SA purchased HYT's assets later that year.

References 

Watch manufacturing companies of Switzerland
Swiss watch brands
Swiss companies established in 2012
Companies that filed for Chapter 11 bankruptcy in 2021

fr:HYT